There are seventeen radio stations in Mumbai, twelve of which broadcast in the frequency modulation (FM) band. Two of these are broadcast by All India Radio (AIR) . Thane, Bhiwandi, Kalyan, Navi Mumbai is also covered by these stations. Three stations, all run by AIR, broadcast on the amplitude modulation (AM) medium wave (MW) band. One broadcasts on the AM short wave (SW) band, which is also an AIR station. There are also a few internet-based radio shows starting up in the city.  These include Tiffin Talk, a show that describes itself as "a new radio project in Mumbai with the simple goal of delivering relevant discussion."  It is a weekly show focusing on political, business, and cultural issues that distributes as a podcast.  There is also TD Radio, a show created by Teen Diaries LLC, that focuses on teen issues in the city.  It airs live via webcast. One of them is Hasya Katta Official an internet-based radio station by Smit Shetye which airs live via webcast. It's broadcast covers Thane, Mumbai.

AM

Mediumwave

ShortWave (SW)

FM

Internet Radio

References 

 Prasar Bharti Mumbai
Hasya Katta Official

Radio Stations
Mumbai